Courtney Stephen (born October 27, 1989) is a former professional Canadian football defensive back. He played CIS Football for the Wilfrid Laurier Golden Hawks from 2008 to 2009 before transferring and playing for the Northern Illinois Huskies from 2010 to 2012. He played in the Canadian Football League (CFL) from 2013 to 2020 for the Hamilton Tiger-Cats and Calgary Stampeders.

Professional career
Stephen was drafted by the Hamilton Tiger-Cats eighth overall in the 2012 CFL Draft and signed with the team on May 23, 2013. He played for the Tiger-Cats for six years before signing with the Calgary Stampeders on February 14, 2019. Upon becoming a free agent, he re-signed with the Tiger-Cats on February 11, 2020. He signed a contract extension with the Tiger-Cats on December 29, 2020. He retired from football on June 24, 2021.

References

External links
Hamilton Tiger-Cats bio 

1989 births
Living people
People from Brampton
Canadian football defensive backs
Northern Illinois Huskies football players
Wilfrid Laurier Golden Hawks football players
Hamilton Tiger-Cats players
Players of Canadian football from Ontario
Calgary Stampeders players